The 2016 Maine Democratic presidential caucuses took place on March 6 in the U.S. state of Maine as one of the Democratic Party's primaries ahead of the 2016 presidential election.

While on the same day, the Democratic Party didn't hold any other primary, the Republican Party held its Puerto Rico primary the same day.

Opinion polling

Results

Analysis
Bernie Sanders scored a large two-to-one victory in Maine, thanks to  support in a caucus contest (which favored Sanders) and one that had previously voted for Barack Obama over Hillary Clinton in the 2008 Maine Democratic presidential caucuses. Sanders won in the cities of Portland and Bangor quite comfortably, but his particular strength was in rural areas outside of the cities where he ran up big margins.

Sanders's landslide Maine victory limited Clinton's success in New England to a slim victory in Massachusetts and a more comfortable win in Connecticut on April 26.

References

Maine
Democratic caucuses
2016